The Lucille Lortel Theatre is an off-Broadway playhouse at 121 Christopher Street in Manhattan's West Village. It was built in 1926 as a 590-seat movie theater called the New Hudson, later known as Hudson Playhouse. The interior is largely unchanged to this day.

It closed after seven performances. Much more successful was The Threepenny Opera which opened March 10, 1954, with a cast that included Bea Arthur, John Astin, Lotte Lenya, Leon Lishner, Scott Merrill, Gerald Price, Charlotte Rae and Jo Sullivan. Because of an incoming booking, it was forced to close after 96 performances. Re-opening September 20, 1955, with largely the same cast, The Threepenny Opera this time played until December 17, 1961, a then record-setting run for a musical in New York City.

In 1955, financier Louis Schweitzer acquired the building as an anniversary present for his wife, actress-producer Lucille Lortel. In 1981, the year of her 81st birthday, the theatre was renamed in her honor. After Lortel's death in April 1999, she left the theatre to the Lucille Lortel Foundation.

Timeline of productions
1953: Maya
1953: The Scarecrow
1953: The School for Scandal
1953: The Little Clay Cart
1953: Little Red Riding Hood
1953: End as a Man
1953: The Knight of the Burning Pestle
1953: Moon in Capricorn
1954: Bullfight
1954: The Threepenny Opera
1955: The Immortal Husband
1955: Teach Me How to Cry
1955: The Threepenny Opera
1956: Cry, the Beloved Country
1956: Lovers, Villains and Fools of Shakespeare
1956: U.S.A.
1957: The Happy Prince
1957: The Birthday of the Infanta
1957: Hamlet
1957: Pelléas and Mélisande
1957: Metamorphosis
1957: Candida
1957: World Famous Dramatic Recitals
1957: Pale Horse, Pale Rider
1957: Santa Claus
1957: For the Time Being
1958: Edward II
1958: Guests of the Nation
1958: Aria Da Capo
1958: Maidens and Mistresses at Home at the Zoo
1958: The Catbird Seat
1958: Riders to the Sea
1958: Blood Wedding
1958: Curtains Up
1959: Philoctetes (Andre Gide play)
1959: Philoctetes (Sophocles play)
1959: Sweet Confession
1959: I Rise in Flame, Cried the Phoenix
1959: Soul Gone Home
1959: Shakespeare in Harlem
1959: This Music Crept by Me Upon the Waters
1959: A Masque of Reason
1959: The Purification
1959: Glory in the Flower
1960: Victims of Duty
1960: Notes from the Underground
1960: Too Close for Comfort
1960: The Gay Apprentice
1960: The Coggerers
1960: Time to Go
1960: Nekros
1960: Fam and Yam
1960: Embers
1960: The Lady Akane
1960: Hanjo
1960: The Shepherd's Chameleon
1964: As You Like It
1967: The Viewing, (Lyle Kessler); The Deer Park
1967    Now Is the Time for All Good Men
1968: House of Flowers; Private Lives
1968    Futz
1969: Dames at Sea
1971: Black Girl
1971    Acrobats/Line
1973: Moonchildren
1973: The Children’s Mass
1976: Eden
1977    A Life in the Theatre
1981: Cloud 9; A Soldier's Play
1984: 'night, Mother
1987: Steel Magnolias
1990: Falsettoland
1992: Lips Together, Teeth Apart; The Destiny of Me
1995    Mrs. Klein
1996: The Boys in the Band
1997: As Bees In Honey Drown
2004: Fat Pig
2006: Some Girl(s)
2007: In a Dark Dark House
2007: Seussical
2008: reasons to be pretty
2009: Coraline
2012: Carrie
2016: The School for Scandal <ref>{{cite news |url=http://www.timeout.com/newyork/theater/the-school-for-scandal |title=Review: The School for Scandal |first=Helen |last=Shaw |journal=Time Out |location=New York |date=April 22, 2006}}</ref>
2016: Ride the Cyclone2017: The Lightning ThiefIn popular culture
In 1970, the theatre was used in "Manhattan Manhunt", a first-season episode of McCloud. It used both interior and an exterior shots with the original marquee "".
In 1996–97, for the TV comedy Friends'' , the theatre was used for the filming of 3 episodes of season 3: episode 19 ("The One with the Tiny T-Shirt"), episode 20 ("The One with the Dollhouse"), and episode 22 ("The One with the Screamer"), which guest-starred Ben Stiller as Rachel's crazy boyfriend Tommy.

References

External links

 
 Productions, past and future
 
 
 

Off-Broadway theaters
1953 establishments in New York City
Christopher Street